Sandnes Church is a parish church of the Church of Norway in the large Sandnes municipality in Rogaland county, Norway. It is located in the borough of Trones og Sentrum in the centre of the city of Sandnes in the far western part of the municipality. It is the church for the Sandnes parish and it is the seat of the Sandnes prosti (deanery) in the Diocese of Stavanger. The red, brick church was built in a long church design in 1882 using plans drawn up by the architect Hartvig Sverdrup Eckhoff. The neo-gothic church seats about 420 people.

History
The city of Sandnes was established as a ladested in 1860 and at the same time it was separated from the large municipality of Høyland. The city was without a church of its own for its first 22 years in existence. During that time, residents of Sandnes municipality (and parish) had to go to the nearby Høyland Church, located in outside of the city (and in a different parish). It wasn't until 1880 when the parish began to raise funds and construct the new church. The new church was completed in 1882. When the church was renovated in 1962–1963, the nave and choir were extended in order to enlarge the church.

Media gallery

See also
List of churches in Rogaland

References

Sandnes
Churches in Rogaland
Brick churches in Norway
20th-century Church of Norway church buildings
Churches completed in 1882
1882 establishments in Norway